The Loeb Classical Library (LCL; named after James Loeb;) is a series of books originally published by Heinemann in London, but is currently published by Harvard University Press. The library contains important works of ancient Greek and Latin literature designed to make the text accessible to the broadest possible audience by presenting the original Greek or Latin text on each left-hand page, and a fairly literal translation on the facing page. The General Editor is Jeffrey Henderson, holder of the William Goodwin Aurelio Professorship of Greek Language and Literature at Boston University.

History
The Loeb Classical Library was conceived and initially funded by the Jewish-German-American banker and philanthropist James Loeb (1867–1933). The first volumes were edited by Thomas Ethelbert Page, W. H. D. Rouse, and Edward Capps, and published by William Heinemann, Ltd. (London) in 1912, already in their distinctive green (for Greek text) and red (for Latin) hardcover bindings. Since then scores of new titles have been added, and the earliest translations have been revised several times. In recent years, this has included the removal of bowdlerization from earlier editions, which often reversed the gender of the subjects of romantic interest to disguise homosexual references or (in the case of early editions of Longus's Daphnis and Chloe) translated sexually explicit passages from the Ancient Greek into Latin, rather than English.

Since 1934, the library has been co-published with Harvard University. Profit from the editions continues to fund graduate student fellowships at Harvard University.

The Loebs have only a minimal critical apparatus, when compared to other publications of the text. They are intended for the amateur reader of Greek or Latin, and are so nearly ubiquitous as to be instantly recognizable.

In 1917 Virginia Woolf wrote (in The Times Literary Supplement):

Harvard University assumed complete responsibility for the series in 1989 and in recent years four or five new or re-edited volumes have been published annually.

In 2001, Harvard University Press began issuing a second series of books with a similar format. The I Tatti Renaissance Library presents key Renaissance works in Latin with a facing English translation; it is bound similarly to the Loeb Classics, but in a larger format and with blue covers. A third series, the Dumbarton Oaks Medieval Library, was introduced in 2010 covering works in Byzantine Greek, Medieval Latin, and Old English. Volumes have the same format as the I Tatti series, but with a brown cover. The Clay Sanskrit Library, bound in teal cloth, was also modeled on the Loeb Classical Library.

As the command of Latin among generalist historians and archaeologists shrank in the course of the 20th century, professionals came increasingly to rely on these texts designed for amateurs. As Birgitta Hoffmann remarked in 2001 of Tacitus' Agricola, "Unfortunately the first thing that happens in bilingual versions like the Loebs is that most of this apparatus vanishes and, if you use a translation, there is usually no way of knowing that there were problems with the text in the first place."

In 2014, the Loeb Classical Library Foundation and Harvard University Press launched the digital Loeb Classical Library, described as "an interconnected, fully searchable, perpetually growing, virtual library of all that is important in Greek and Latin literature."

Influence

The Loeb Library serves as a model to be emulated for:
 The Dumbarton Oaks Medieval Library, published by Harvard University Press.
 The I Tatti Renaissance Library, founded in 2001 and published by Harvard University Press;
 The Murty Classical Library of India, founded in 2015 and published by Harvard University Press.
 The Seiyō koten sōsho Western (Greek and Latin) Classics Library, established in 1997 and published by Kyoto University Press.
 The Biblioteka Renesansowa (Renaissance Library), founded in 2008 and published by the Warsaw University Press

Volumes
The listings of Loeb volumes at online bookstores and library catalogues vary considerably and are often best navigated via ISBN numbers.

Greek

Poetry

Homer
 L170N) Iliad, Second Edition: Volume I. Books 1–12. .
 L171N) Iliad: Volume II. Books 13–24. .
 L104) Odyssey: Volume I. Books 1–12. .
 L105) Odyssey: Volume II. Books 13–24. .

Hesiod
 L057N) Volume I. Theogony. Works and Days. Testimonia. .
 L503) Volume II. The Shield. Catalogue of Women. Other Fragments. .

Nonnus
 L344) Dionysiaca: Volume I. Books 1–15
 L354) Dionysiaca: Volume II. Books 16–35
 L356) Dionysiaca: Volume III. Books 36–48

Other epic poetry
 L496) Homeric Hymns. Homeric Apocrypha. Lives of Homer
 L497)  Greek Epic Fragments (including the Epic Cycle)
 L001) Apollonius Rhodius: Argonautica
 L019N) Quintus Smyrnaeus: Posthomerica
 L219) Oppian, Colluthus, and Tryphiodorus

Lyric, iambic and elegiac poetry
 L142) Greek Lyric Poetry: Volume I. Sappho and Alcaeus
 L143) Greek Lyric Poetry: Volume II. Anacreon, Anacreontea, Choral Lyric from Olympus to Alcman
 L476) Greek Lyric Poetry: Volume III. Stesichorus, Ibycus, Simonides, and Others
 L461) Greek Lyric Poetry: Volume IV. Bacchylides, Corinna, and Others
 L144) Greek Lyric Poetry: Volume V. The New School of Poetry and Anonymous Songs and Hymns
 L258N) Greek Elegiac Poetry: From the Seventh to the Fifth Centuries BC. Tyrtaeus, Solon, Theognis, and Others
 L259N) Greek Iambic Poetry: From the Seventh to the Fifth Centuries BC. Archilochus, Semonides, Hipponax, and Others
 L056) Pindar: Volume I. Olympian Odes. Pythian Odes. .
 L485) Pindar: Volume II. Nemean Odes. Isthmian Odes. Fragments. .

Other Hellenistic poetry
 L129) Callimachus: Hymns, Epigrams. Phaenomena. Alexandra
 L421) Callimachus: Aetia, Iambi, Hecale and Other Fragments. Hero and Leander
 L550) Callimachus: Miscellaneous Epics and Elegies. Other Fragments. Testimonia
 L028) Greek Bucolic Poets: Theocritus. Bion. Moschus
 L508) Hellenistic Collection: Philitas. Alexander of Aetolia. Hermesianax. Euphorion. Parthenius

Greek Anthology
 L067) Volume I. Book 1: Christian Epigrams. Book 2: Christodorus of Thebes in Egypt. Book 3: The Cyzicene Epigrams. Book 4: The Proems of the Different Anthologies. Book 5: The Amatory Epigrams. Book 6: The Dedicatory Epigrams
 L068) Volume II. Book 7: Sepulchral Epigrams. Book 8: The Epigrams of St. Gregory the Theologian
 L084) Volume III. Book 9: The Declamatory Epigrams
 L085) Volume IV. Book 10: The Hortatory and Admonitory Epigrams. Book 11: The Convivial and Satirical Epigrams. Book 12: Strato's Musa Puerilis
 L086) Volume V. Book 13: Epigrams in Various Metres. Book 14: Arithmetical Problems, Riddles, Oracles. Book 15: Miscellanea. Book 16: Epigrams of the Planudean Anthology Not in the Palatine Manuscript

Drama

Aeschylus
 L145N) Volume I. Persians. Seven Against Thebes. Suppliant Maidens. Prometheus Bound. .
 L146N) Volume II. Oresteia: Agamemnon. Libation-Bearers. Eumenides. .
 L505) Volume III. Fragments. .

Sophocles
 L020) Volume I. Ajax. Electra. Oedipus Tyrannus 
 L021) Volume II. Antigone. The Women of Trachis. Philoctetes. Oedipus at Colonus 
 L483) Volume III. Fragments

Euripides
 L012) Volume I. Cyclops. Alcestis. Medea
 L484) Volume II. Children of Heracles. Hippolytus. Andromache. Hecuba
 L009) Volume III. Suppliant Women. Electra. Heracles
 L010N) Volume IV. Trojan Women. Iphigenia among the Taurians. Ion
 L011N) Volume V. Helen. Phoenician Women. Orestes
 L495) Volume VI. Bacchae. Iphigenia at Aulis. Rhesus
 L504) Volume VII. Fragments: Aegeus-Meleager
 L506) Volume VIII. Fragments: Oedipus-Chrysippus. Other Fragments

Aristophanes
 L178) Volume I. Acharnians. Knights
 L488) Volume II. Clouds. Wasps. Peace
 L179N) Volume III. Birds. Lysistrata. Women at the Thesmophoria
 L180N) Volume IV. Frogs. Assemblywomen. Wealth
 L502) Volume V. Fragments

Fragments of Old Comedy
 L513) Volume I. Alcaeus to Diocles
 L514) Volume II. Diopeithes to Pherecrates
 L515) Volume III. Philonicus to Xenophon. Adespota

Menander
 L132) Volume I. Aspis. Georgos. Dis Exapaton. Dyskolos. Encheiridion. Epitrepontes
 L459) Volume II. Heros. Theophoroumene. Karchedonios. Kitharistes. Kolax. Koneiazomenai. Leukadia. Misoumenos. Perikeiromene. Perinthia
 L460N) Volume III. Samia. Sikyonioi. Synaristosai. Phasma. Unidentified Fragments

Philosophers

Early Greek Philosophy
 L524) Volume I. Introductory and Reference Materials
 L525) Volume II. Beginnings and Early Ionian Thinkers, Part 1
 L526) Volume III. Early Ionian Thinkers, Part 2
 L527) Volume IV. Western Greek Thinkers, Part 1
 L528) Volume V. Western Greek Thinkers, Part 2
 L529) Volume VI. Later Ionian and Athenian Thinkers, Part 1
 L530) Volume VII. Later Ionian and Athenian Thinkers, Part 2
 L531) Volume VIII. Sophists, Part 1
 L532) Volume IX. Sophists, Part 2

Aristotle
 L325) Volume I. Categories. On Interpretation. Prior Analytics 
 L391) Volume II. Posterior Analytics. Topica 
 L400) Volume III. On Sophistical Refutations. On Coming-to-be and Passing Away. On the Cosmos 
 L228) Volume IV. Physics, Books 1–4 
 L255) Volume V. Physics, Books 5–8 
 L338) Volume VI. On the Heavens 
 L397) Volume VII. Meteorologica 
 L288) Volume VIII. On the Soul. Parva Naturalia. On Breath 
 L437) Volume IX. History of Animals, Books 1–3 
 L438) Volume X. History of Animals, Books 4–6 
 L439) Volume XI. History of Animals, Books 7–10 
 L323) Volume XII. Parts of Animals. Movement of Animals. Progression of Animals 
 L366) Volume XIII. Generation of Animals 
 L307) Volume XIV. Minor Works: On Colours. On Things Heard. Physiognomics. On Plants. On Marvellous Things Heard. Mechanical Problems. On Indivisible Lines. The Situations and Names of Winds. On Melissus, Xenophanes, Gorgias 
 L316) Volume XV. Problems, Books 1–21 
 L317) Volume XVI. Problems, Books 22–38. Rhetorica ad Alexandrum 
 L271) Volume XVII. Metaphysics, Books 1–9 
 L287) Volume XVIII. Metaphysics, Books 10–14. Oeconomica. Magna Moralia 
 L073) Volume XIX. Nicomachean Ethics 
 L285) Volume XX. Athenian Constitution. Eudemian Ethics. Virtues and Vices 
 L264) Volume XXI. Politics 
 L193) Volume XXII. The Art of Rhetoric 
 L199) Volume XXIII. Poetics. Longinus, On the Sublime. Demetrius, On Style

Athenaeus
 L204) The Deipnosophists: Volume I. Books 1–3.106e
 L208) The Deipnosophists: Volume II. Books 3.106e-5
 L224) The Deipnosophists: Volume III. Books 6–7
 L235) The Deipnosophists: Volume IV. Books 8–10
 L274) The Deipnosophists: Volume V. Books 11–12
 L327) The Deipnosophists: Volume VI. Books 13–14.653b
 L345) The Deipnosophists: Volume VII. Books 14.653b-15
 L519) The Deipnosophists: Volume VIII. Book 15

Epictetus
 L131) Volume I. Discourses, Books 1–2
 L218) Volume II. Discourses, Books 3–4. Fragments. The Encheiridion

Marcus Aurelius
 L058) Collected works

Philo
 L226) Volume I. On the Creation. Allegorical Interpretation of Genesis 2 and 3
 L227) Volume II. On the Cherubim. The Sacrifices of Abel and Cain. The Worse Attacks the Better. On the Posterity and Exile of Cain. On the Giants
 L247) Volume III. On the Unchangeableness of God. On Husbandry. Concerning Noah's Work As a Planter. On Drunkenness. On Sobriety
 L261) Volume IV. On the Confusion of Tongues. On the Migration of Abraham. Who Is the Heir of Divine Things? On Mating with the Preliminary Studies
 L275) Volume V. On Flight and Finding. On the Change of Names. On Dreams
 L289) Volume VI. On Abraham. On Joseph. On Moses
 L320) Volume VII. On the Decalogue. On the Special Laws, Books 1–3
 L341) Volume VIII. On the Special Laws, Book 4. On the Virtues. On Rewards and Punishments
 L363) Volume IX. Every Good Man is Free. On the Contemplative Life. On the Eternity of the World. Against Flaccus. Apology for the Jews. On Providence
 L379) Volume X. On the Embassy to Gaius. General Indexes
 L380) Supplement I: Questions and Answers on Genesis
 L401) Supplement II: Questions and Answers on Exodus

Plato
 L036) Volume I. Euthyphro. Apology. Crito. Phaedo. Phaedrus 
 L036N) Volume I. Euthyphro. Apology. Crito. Phaedo.
 L165) Volume II. Laches. Protagoras. Meno. Euthydemus 
 L166) Volume III. Lysis. Symposium. Gorgias 
 L167) Volume IV. Cratylus. Parmenides. Greater Hippias. Lesser Hippias 
 L237) Volume V. The Republic, Books 1–5 
 L276) Volume VI. The Republic, Books 6–10 
 L123) Volume VII. Theaetetus. Sophist 
 L164) Volume VIII. Statesman. Philebus. Ion 
 L234) Volume IX. Timaeus. Critias. Cleitophon. Menexenus. Epistles 
 L187) Volume X. Laws, Books 1–6 
 L192) Volume XI. Laws, Books 7–12 
 L201) Volume XII. Charmides. Alcibiades 1 & 2. Hipparchus. The Lovers. Theages. Minos. Epinomis

Plotinus
 L440) Volume I. Porphyry's Life of Plotinus. Ennead 1
 L441) Volume II. Ennead 2
 L442) Volume III. Ennead 3
 L443) Volume IV. Ennead 4
 L444) Volume V. Ennead 5
 L445) Volume VI. Ennead 6.1–5
 L468) Volume VII. Ennead 6.6–9

Plutarch
 L197) Moralia: Volume I. The Education of Children. How the Young Man Should Study Poetry. On Listening to Lectures. How to Tell a Flatterer from a Friend. How a Man May Become Aware of His Progress in Virtue
 L222) Moralia: Volume II. How to Profit by One's Enemies. On Having Many Friends. Chance. Virtue and Vice. Letter of Condolence to Apollonius. Advice About Keeping Well. Advice to Bride and Groom. The Dinner of the Seven Wise Men. Superstition
 L245) Moralia: Volume III. Sayings of Kings and Commanders. Sayings of Romans. Sayings of Spartans. The Ancient Customs of the Spartans. Sayings of Spartan Women. Bravery of Women
 L305) Moralia: Volume IV. Roman Questions. Greek Questions. Greek and Roman Parallel Stories. On the Fortune of the Romans. On the Fortune or the Virtue of Alexander. Were the Athenians More Famous in War or in Wisdom?
 L306) Moralia: Volume V. Isis and Osiris. The E at Delphi. The Oracles at Delphi No Longer Given in Verse. The Obsolescence of Oracles
 L337) Moralia: Volume VI. Can Virtue Be Taught? On Moral Virtue. On the Control of Anger. On Tranquility of Mind. On Brotherly Love. On Affection for Offspring. Whether Vice Be Sufficient to Cause Unhappiness. Whether the Affections of the Soul are Worse Than Those of the Body. Concerning Talkativeness. On Being a Busybody
 L405) Moralia: Volume VII. On Love of Wealth. On Compliancy. On Envy and Hate. On Praising Oneself Inoffensively. On the Delays of the Divine Vengeance. On Fate. On the Sign of Socrates. On Exile. Consolation to His Wife
 L424) Moralia: Volume VIII. Table-talk, Books 1–6
 L425) Moralia: Volume IX. Table-Talk, Books 7–9. Dialogue on Love
 L321) Moralia: Volume X. Love Stories. That a Philosopher Ought to Converse Especially With Men in Power. To an Uneducated Ruler. Whether an Old Man Should Engage in Public Affairs. Precepts of Statecraft. On Monarchy, Democracy, and Oligarchy. That We Ought Not To Borrow. Lives of the Ten Orators. Summary of a Comparison Between Aristophanes and Menander
 L426) Moralia: Volume XI. On the Malice of Herodotus. Causes of Natural Phenomena
 L406) Moralia: Volume XII. Concerning the Face Which Appears in the Orb of the Moon. On the Principle of Cold. Whether Fire or Water Is More Useful. Whether Land or Sea Animals Are Cleverer. Beasts Are Rational. On the Eating of Flesh
 L427) Moralia: Volume XIII. Part 1. Platonic Essays
 L470) Moralia: Volume XIII. Part 2. Stoic Essays
 L428) Moralia: Volume XIV. That Epicurus Actually Makes a Pleasant Life Impossible. Reply to Colotes in Defence of the Other Philosophers. Is "Live Unknown" a Wise Precept? On Music
 L429) Moralia: Volume XV. Fragments
 L499) Moralia: Volume XVI. Index

Ptolemy
 L435) Tetrabiblos

Sextus Empiricus
 L273) Volume I. Outlines of Pyrrhonism
 L291) Volume II. Against the Logicians
 L311) Volume III. Against the Physicists. Against the Ethicists
 L382) Volume IV. Against the Professors

Theophrastus
 L070) Enquiry into Plants: Volume I. Books 1–5
 L079) Enquiry into Plants: Volume II. Books 6–9. Treatise on Odours. Concerning Weather Signs
 L225) Characters. Mimes. Cercidas and the Choliambic Poets
 L225N) Characters. Herodas, Mimes. Sophron and Other Mime Fragments
 L471) De Causis Plantarum: Volume I. Books 1–2
 L474) De Causis Plantarum: Volume II. Books 3–4
 L475) De Causis Plantarum: Volume III. Books 5–6

Greek Mathematics (extracts)
 L335) Greek Mathematical Works: Volume I. From Thales to Euclid. .
 L362) Greek Mathematical Works: Volume II. From Aristarchus to Pappus. .

Historians

Appian
 L002N) Roman History: Volume I. Books 1–7 (New edition by Brian McGing)
 L003N) Roman History: Volume II. Books 8–10 (New edition by Brian McGing)
 L004N) Roman History: Volume III. Books 11–12 (New edition by Brian McGing)
 L005N) Roman History: Volume IV. Civil Wars, Books 1–2 (New edition by Brian McGing)
 L543) Roman History: Volume V: Civil Wars, Books 3–4
 L544) Roman History: Volume VI: Civil Wars, Book 5. Fragments

Arrian
 L236) Volume I. Anabasis of Alexander, Books 1–4
 L269) Volume II. Anabasis of Alexander, Books 5–7. Indica

Dio Cassius
 L032) Roman History: Volume I. Fragments of Books 1–11
 L037) Roman History: Volume II. Fragments of Books 12–35 and of Uncertain Reference
 L053) Roman History: Volume III. Books 36–40
 L066) Roman History: Volume IV. Books 41–45
 L082) Roman History: Volume V. Books 46–50
 L083) Roman History: Volume VI. Books 51–55
 L175) Roman History: Volume VII. Books 56–60
 L176) Roman History: Volume VIII. Books 61–70
 L177) Roman History: Volume IX. Books 71–80

Diodorus Siculus
 L279) Volume I. Library of History, Books 1–2.34. .
 L303) Volume II. Library of History, Books 2.35–4.58. .
 L340) Volume III. Library of History, Books 4.59–8. .
 L375) Volume IV. Library of History, Books 9–12.40. .
 L384) Volume V. Library of History, Books 12.41–13. .
 L399) Volume VI. Library of History, Books 14–15.19. .
 L389) Volume VII. Library of History, Books 15.20–16.65. .
 L422) Volume VIII. Library of History, Books 16.66–17
 L377) Volume IX. Library of History, Books 18–19.65
 L390) Volume X. Library of History, Books 19.66–20
 L409) Volume XI. Library of History, Fragments of Books 21–32
 L423) Volume XII. Library of History, Fragments of Books 33–40

Herodian
 L454) History of the Empire: Volume I. Books 1–4
 L455) History of the Empire: Volume II. Books 5–8

Herodotus
 L117) The Persian Wars: Volume I. Books 1–2 
 L118) The Persian Wars: Volume II. Books 3–4 
 L119) The Persian Wars: Volume III. Books 5–7 
 L120) The Persian Wars: Volume IV. Books 8–9

Josephus
 L186) Volume I. The Life of Flavius Josephus. Against Apion
 L203) Volume II. The Jewish War, Books 1–2
 L487) Volume III. The Jewish War, Books 3–4
 L210) Volume IV. The Jewish War, Books 5–7:
 L242) Volume V. Jewish Antiquities, Books 1–3
 L490) Volume VI. Jewish Antiquities, Books 4–6
 L281) Volume VII. Jewish Antiquities, Books 7–8
 L326) Volume VIII. Jewish Antiquities, Books 9–11
 L365) Volume IX. Jewish Antiquities, Books 12–13
 L489) Volume X. Jewish Antiquities, Books 14–15
 L410) Volume XI. Jewish Antiquities, Books 16–17
 L433) Volume XII. Jewish Antiquities, Books 18–19
 L456) Volume XIII. Jewish Antiquities, Book 20

Manetho
 L350) History of Egypt and Other Works

Polybius
 L128) Histories: Volume I. Books 1–2
 L137) Histories: Volume II. Books 3–4
 L138) Histories: Volume III. Books 5–8
 L159) Histories: Volume IV. Books 9–15
 L160) Histories: Volume V. Books 16–27
 L161) Histories: Volume VI. Books 28–39

Procopius
 L048) Volume I. History of the Wars, Books 1–2. (Persian War)
 L081) Volume II. History of the Wars, Books 3–4. (Vandalic War)
 L107) Volume III. History of the Wars, Books 5–6.15. (Gothic War)
 L173) Volume IV. History of the Wars, Books 6.16–7.35. (Gothic War)
 L217) Volume V. History of the Wars, Books 7.36–8. (Gothic War)
 L290) Volume VI. The Anecdota or Secret History
 L343) Volume VII. On Buildings. General Index

Thucydides
 L108) History of the Peloponnesian War: Volume I. Books 1–2. .
 L109) History of the Peloponnesian War: Volume II. Books 3–4. .
 L110) History of the Peloponnesian War: Volume III. Books 5–6. .
 L169) History of the Peloponnesian War: Volume IV. Books 7–8. General Index. .

Xenophon
 L088) Volume I. Hellenica, Books 1–4
 L089) Volume II. Hellenica, Books 5–7
 L090) Volume III. Anabasis
 L168) Volume IV. Memorabilia and Oeconomicus. Symposium and Apologia
 L051) Volume V. Cyropaedia, Books 1–4
 L052) Volume VI. Cyropaedia, Books 5–8
 L183) Volume VII. Hiero. Agesilaus. Constitution of the Lacedaemonians. Ways and Means. Cavalry Commander. Art of Horsemanship. On Hunting. Old Oligarch: Constitution of the Athenians

Attic orators

Aeschines
 L106) Collected works

Demosthenes
 L238) Volume I. Olynthiacs 1–3. Philippic 1. On the Peace. Philippic 2. On Halonnesus. On the Chersonese. Philippics 3 and 4. Answer to Philip's Letter. Philip's Letter. On Organization. On the Navy-boards. For the Liberty of the Rhodians. For the People of Meg
 L155) Volume II. De Corona, De Falsa Legatione (18–19)
 L299) Volume III. Against Meidias. Against Androtion. Against Aristocrates. Against Timocrates. Against Aristogeiton 1 and 2 (21–26)
 L318) Volume IV. Private Orations (27–40)
 L346) Volume V. Private Orations (41–49)
 L351) Volume VI. Private Orations (50–58). Against Neaera (59)
 L374) Volume VII. Funeral Speech (60). Erotic Essay (61). Exordia. Letters

Isaeus
 L202) Collected works

Isocrates
 L209) Volume I. To Demonicus. To Nicocles. Nicocles or the Cyprians. Panegyricus. To Philip. Archidamus
 L229) Volume II. On the Peace. Areopagiticus. Against the Sophists. Antidosis. Panathenaicus
 L373) Volume III. Evagoras. Helen. Busiris. Plataicus. Concerning the Team of Horses. Trapeziticus. Against Callimachus. Aegineticus. Against Lochites. Against Euthynus. Letters

Lysias
 L244) Collected works

Minor Attic Orators
 L308) Minor Attic Orators: Volume I. Antiphon and Andocides
 L395) Minor Attic Orators: Volume II. Lycurgus. Dinarchus. Demades. Hyperides

Biography

Plutarch
 L046) Parallel Lives: Volume I. Theseus and Romulus. Lycurgus and Numa. Solon and Publicola
 L047) Parallel Lives: Volume II. Themistocles and Camillus. Aristides and Cato Major. Cimon and Lucullus
 L065) Parallel Lives: Volume III. Pericles and Fabius Maximus. Nicias and Crassus
 L080) Parallel Lives: Volume IV. Alcibiades and Coriolanus. Lysander and Sulla
 L087) Parallel Lives: Volume V. Agesilaus and Pompey. Pelopidas and Marcellus
 L098) Parallel Lives: Volume VI. Dion and Brutus. Timoleon and Aemilius Paulus
 L099) Parallel Lives: Volume VII. Demosthenes and Cicero. Alexander and Julius Caesar
 L100) Parallel Lives: Volume VIII. Sertorius and Eumenes. Phocion and Cato the Younger
 L101) Parallel Lives: Volume IX. Demetrius and Antony. Pyrrhus and Gaius Marius
 L102) Parallel Lives: Volume X. Agis and Cleomenes. Tiberius and Gaius Gracchus. Philopoemen and Flamininus
 L103) Parallel Lives: Volume XI. Aratus. Artaxerxes. Galba. Otho. General Index

Diogenes Laërtius
 L184) Lives of Eminent Philosophers: Volume I. Books 1–5
 L185) Lives of Eminent Philosophers: Volume II. Books 6–10

Philostratus
 L016) Life of Apollonius of Tyana: Volume I. Books 1–5
 L017) Life of Apollonius of Tyana: Volume II. Books 6–8. Epistles of Apollonius. Eusebius: Treatise
 L458) Life of Apollonius of Tyana: Volume III. Letters of Apollonius, Ancient Testimonia, Eusebius′s Reply to Hierocles
 L134) Lives of the Sophists. Eunapius: Lives of the Philosophers and Sophists

Ancient Greek novel
 L481) Chariton: Callirhoe
 L045) Achilles Tatius: Leucippe and Clitophon
 L069) Longus: Daphnis and Chloe. Xenophon of Ephesus: Anthia and Habrocomes

Greek Fathers

Basil
 L190) Letters: Volume I. Letters 1–58
 L215) Letters: Volume II. Letters 59–185
 L243) Letters: Volume III. Letters 186–248
 L270) Letters: Volume IV. Letters 249–368. Address to Young Men on Greek Literature

Clement of Alexandria
 L092) The Exhortation to the Greeks. The Rich Man's Salvation. To the Newly Baptized (fragment)

Eusebius
 L153) Ecclesiastical History: Volume I. Books 1–5
 L265) Ecclesiastical History: Volume II. Books 6–10

John Damascene
 L034) Barlaam and Ioasaph

Apostolic Fathers
(edited by Bart Ehrman, replacing Kirsopp Lake's edition)
 L024) Apostolic Fathers: Volume I. I Clement. II Clement. Ignatius. Polycarp. Didache. Barnabas
 L025) Apostolic Fathers: Volume II. Shepherd of Hermas. Martyrdom of Polycarp. Epistle to Diognetus

Other Greek prose

Aelian
 L446) On the Characteristics of Animals: Volume I. Books 1–5
 L448) On the Characteristics of Animals: Volume II. Books 6–11
 L449) On the Characteristics of Animals: Volume III. Books 12–17
 L486) Historical Miscellany

Aelius Aristides
 L533) Orations: Volume I

Aeneas Tacticus
 L156) Aeneas Tacticus, Asclepiodotus, and Onasander

Babrius and Phaedrus
 L436) Fables

Alciphron
 L383) Alciphron, Aelian, and Philostratus: The Letters

Apollodorus
 L121) The Library: Volume I. Books 1–3.9
 L122) The Library: Volume II. Book 3.10-end. Epitome

Dio Chrysostom
 L257) Discourses 1–11: Volume I
 L339) Discourses 12–30: Volume II
 L358) Discourses 31–36: Volume III
 L376) Discourses 37–60: Volume IV
 L385) Discourses 61–80. Fragments. Letters: Volume V

Dionysius of Halicarnassus
 L319) Roman Antiquities: Volume I. Books 1–2
 L347) Roman Antiquities: Volume II. Books 3–4
 L357) Roman Antiquities: Volume III. Books 5–6.48
 L364) Roman Antiquities: Volume IV. Books 6.49–7
 L372) Roman Antiquities: Volume V. Books 8–9.24
 L378) Roman Antiquities: Volume VI. Books 9.25–10
 L388) Roman Antiquities: Volume VII. Book 11. Fragments of Books 12–20
 L465) Critical Essays: Volume I. Ancient Orators. Lysias. Isocrates. Isaeus. Demosthenes. Thucydides
 L466) Critical Essays: Volume II. On Literary Composition. Dinarchus. Letters to Ammaeus and Pompeius

Galen
 L071) On the Natural Faculties
 L516) Method of Medicine: Volume I. Books 1–4
 L517) Method of Medicine: Volume II. Books 5–9
 L518) Method of Medicine: Volume III. Books 10–14
 L523) On the Constitution of the Art of Medicine. The Art of Medicine. A Method of Medicine to Glaucon
 L535) Hygiene: Volume I. Books 1–4
 L536) Hygiene: Volume II. Books 5–6. Thrasybulus. On Exercise with a Small Ball.
 L546) On Temperaments. On Non-Uniform Distemperment. The Soul’s Traits Depend on Bodily Temperament

Hippocrates
 L147) Volume I. Ancient Medicine. Airs, Waters, Places. Epidemics 1 & 3. The Oath. Precepts. Nutriment
 L148) Volume II. Prognostic. Regimen in Acute Diseases. The Sacred Disease. The Art. Breaths. Law. Decorum. Physician (Ch. 1). Dentition
 L149) Volume III. On Wounds in the Head. In the Surgery. On Fractures. On Joints. Mochlicon
 L150) Volume IV. Nature of Man. Regimen in Health. Humours. Aphorisms. Regimen 1–3. Dreams. Heracleitus: On the Universe
 L472) Volume V. Affections. Diseases 1. Diseases 2
 L473) Volume VI. Diseases 3. Internal Affections. Regimen in Acute Diseases (Appendix)
 L477) Volume VII. Epidemics 2, 4–7
 L482) Volume VIII. Places in Man. Glands. Fleshes. Prorrhetic 1–2. Physician. Use of Liquids. Ulcers. Haemorrhoids. Fistulas
 L509) Volume IX. Anatomy. Nature of Bones. Heart. Eight Months' Child. Coan Prenotions. Crises. Critical Days. Superfetation. Girls. Excision of the Fetus. Sight
 L520) Volume X. Generation. Nature of the Child. Diseases 4. Nature of Women. Barrenness
 L538) Volume XI. Diseases of Women 1–2

Julian
 L013) Volume I. Orations 1–5
 L029) Volume II. Orations 6–8. Letters to Themistius, To the Senate and People of Athens, To a Priest. The Caesars. Misopogon
 L157) Volume III. Letters. Epigrams. Against the Galilaeans. Fragments

Libanius
 L451) Selected Orations: Volume I. Julianic Orations
 L452) Selected Orations: Volume II. Orations 2, 19–23, 30, 33, 45, 47–50
 L478) Autobiography and Selected Letters: Volume I. Autobiography. Letters 1–50
 L479) Autobiography and Selected Letters: Volume II. Letters 51–193

Lucian
 L014) Volume I. Phalaris. Hippias or The Bath. Dionysus. Heracles. Amber or The Swans. The Fly. Nigrinus. Demonax. The Hall. My Native Land. Octogenarians. A True Story. Slander. The Consonants at Law. The Carousal (Symposium) or The Lapiths
 L054) Volume II. The Downward Journey or The Tyrant. Zeus Catechized. Zeus Rants. The Dream or The Cock. Prometheus. Icaromenippus or The Sky-man. Timon or The Misanthrope. Charon or The Inspectors. Philosophies for Sale
 L130) Volume III. The Dead Come to Life or The Fisherman. The Double Indictment or Trials by Jury. On Sacrifices. The Ignorant Book Collector. The Dream or Lucian's Career. The Parasite. The Lover of Lies. The Judgement of the Goddesses. On Salaried Posts in Great Houses
 L162) Volume IV. Anacharsis or Athletics. Menippus or The Descent into Hades. On Funerals. A Professor of Public Speaking. Alexander the False Prophet. Essays in Portraiture. Essays in Portraiture Defended. The Goddesse of Surrye
 L302) Volume V. The Passing of Peregrinus. The Runaways. Toxaris or Friendship. The Dance. Lexiphanes. The Eunuch. Astrology. The Mistaken Critic. The Parliament of the Gods. The Tyrannicide. Disowned
 L430) Volume VI. How to Write History. The Dipsads. Saturnalia. Herodotus or Aetion. Zeuxis or Antiochus. A Slip of the Tongue in Greeting. Apology for the "Salaried Posts in Great Houses." Harmonides. A Conversation with Hesiod. The Scythian or The Consul. Hermotimus or Concerning the Sects. To One Who Said "You're a Prometheus in Words." The Ship or The Wishes 
 L431) Volume VII. Dialogues of the Dead. Dialogues of the Sea-Gods. Dialogues of the Gods. Dialogues of the Courtesans
 L432) Volume VIII. Soloecista. Lucius or The Ass. Amores. Halcyon. Demosthenes. Podagra. Ocypus. Cyniscus. Philopatris. Charidemus. Nero

pseudo-Menander Rhetor and pseudo-Dionysius of Halicarnassus
 L539) "Menander", Two treatises. "Dionysius", Ars Rhetorica

Pausanias
 L093) Description of Greece: Volume I. Books 1–2 (Attica and Corinth)
 L188) Description of Greece: Volume II. Books 3–5 (Laconia, Messenia, Elis 1)
 L272) Description of Greece: Volume III. Books 6–8.21 (Elis 2, Achaia, Arcadia)
 L297) Description of Greece: Volume IV. Books 8.22–10 (Arcadia, Boeotia, Phocis and Ozolian Locris)
 L298) Description of Greece: Volume V. Maps, Plans, Illustrations and General Index

Philostratus
 L521) Heroicus. Gymnasticus. Discourses 1 and 2

Philostratus the Elder and Philostratus the Younger
 L256) Philostratus the Elder, Imagines. Philostratus the Younger, Imagines. Callistratus, Descriptions

Strabo
 L049) Geography: Volume I. Books 1–2
 L050) Geography: Volume II. Books 3–5
 L182) Geography: Volume III. Books 6–7
 L196) Geography: Volume IV. Books 8–9
 L211) Geography: Volume V. Books 10–12
 L223) Geography: Volume VI. Books 13–14
 L241) Geography: Volume VII. Books 15–16
 L267) Geography: Volume VIII. Book 17 and General Index

Papyri
 L266) Volume I. Private Documents (Agreements, Receipts, Wills, Letters, Memoranda, Accounts and Lists, and Others)
 L282) Volume II. Public Documents (Codes and Regulations, Edicts and Orders, Public Announcements, Reports of Meetings, Judicial Business, Petitions and Applications, Declarations to Officials, Contracts, Receipts, Accounts and Lists, Correspondence,
 L360) Volume III. Poetry

Latin

Poetry

Ausonius
 L096) Ausonius: Volume I. Books 1–17
 L115) Ausonius: Volume II. Books 18–20. Paulinus Pellaeus: Eucharisticus

Catullus
 L006) Also contains the works of Tibullus; Sulpicia; and (Tiberianus?): Pervigilium Veneris

Claudian
 L135) Volume I. Panegyric on Probinus and Olybrius. Against Rufinus 1 and 2. War Against Gildo. Against Eutropius 1 and 2. Fescennine Verses on the Marriage of Honorius. Epithalamium of Honorius and Maria. Panegyrics on the Third and Fourth Consulships of Honorius
 L136) Volume II. On Stilicho's Consulship 2–3. Panegyric on the Sixth Consulship of Honorius. The Gothic War. Shorter Poems. Rape of Proserpina

Horace
 L033) Odes and Epodes
 L194) Satires. Epistles. The Art of Poetry

Juvenal and Persius
 L091) Collected satires

Lucan
 L220) The Civil War (Pharsalia)

Lucretius
 L181) On the Nature of Things

Manilius
 L469) Astronomica

Martial
 L094) Epigrams: Volume I. Spectacles, Books 1–5
 L095) Epigrams: Volume II. Books 6–10
 L480) Epigrams: Volume III. Books 11–14

Ovid
 L041) Volume I. Heroides. Amores
 L232) Volume II. Art of Love. Cosmetics. Remedies for Love. Ibis. Walnut-tree. Sea Fishing. Consolation
 L042) Volume III. Metamorphoses, Books 1–8
 L043) Volume IV. Metamorphoses, Books 9–15
 L253) Volume V. Fasti
 L151) Volume VI. Tristia. Ex Ponto

Propertius
 L018N) Elegies

Sidonius Apollinaris
 L296) Volume I. Poems. Letters, Books 1–2
 L420) Volume II. Letters, Books 3–9

Silius Italicus
 L277) Punica: Volume I. Books 1–8
 L278) Punica: Volume II. Books 9–17

Statius
 L206N) Volume I. Silvae
 L207N) Volume II. Thebaid, Books 1–7
 L498) Volume III. Thebaid, Books 8–12. Achilleid

Valerius Flaccus
 L286) Argonautica

Virgil
 L063N) Volume I. Eclogues. Georgics. Aeneid, Books 1–6
 L064N) Volume II. Aeneid Books 7–12, Appendix Vergiliana

Minor Latin Poets edited by J. W. Duff
 L284) Minor Latin Poets: Volume I. Publilius Syrus. Elegies on Maecenas. Grattius. Calpurnius Siculus. Laus Pisonis. Einsiedeln Eclogues. Aetna
 L434) Minor Latin Poets: Volume II. Florus. Hadrian. Nemesianus. Reposianus. Tiberianus. Distichs of Cato. Phoenix. Avianus. Rutilius Claudius Namatianus. Others

Drama

Plautus
 L060) Volume I. Amphitryon. The Comedy of Asses. The Pot of Gold. The Two Bacchises. The Captives
 L061) Volume II. Casina. The Casket Comedy. Curculio. Epidicus. The Two Menaechmuses
 L163) Volume III. The Merchant. The Braggart Soldier. The Ghost. The Persian
 L260) Volume IV. The Little Carthaginian. Pseudolus. The Rope
 L328) Volume V. Stichus. Trinummus. Truculentus. Vidularia, or the Tale of a Traveling-Bag. Fragments

Terence
 L022N) Volume I. The Woman of Andros. The Self-Tormentor. The Eunuch
 L023N) Volume II. Phormio. The Mother-in-Law. The Brothers

Seneca the Younger
 L062N) Volume VIII, Tragedies I. Hercules Furens. Troades. Medea. Hippolytus. Oedipus.
 L078N) Volume IX, Tragedies II. Agamemnon. Thyestes. Hercules Oetaeus. Phoenissae. Octavia.

Philosophy

Boethius
 L074) Theological Tractates. The Consolation of Philosophy

Cicero
 L213) Volume XVI. On the Republic (De re publica). On the Laws (De Legibus)
 L040) Volume XVII. On Ends (De Finibus)
 L141) Volume XVIII. Tusculan Disputations
 L268) Volume XIX. On the Nature of the Gods (De Natura Deorum). Academics (Academica)
 L154) Volume XX. On Old Age (De Senectute). On Friendship (De Amicitia). On Divination (De Divinatione)
 L030) Volume XXI. On Duties (De Officiis): De Officiis

Seneca the Younger
 L214) Volume I. Moral Essays: De Providentia. De Constantia. De Ira. De Clementia
 L254) Volume II. Moral Essays: De Consolatione ad Marciam. De Vita Beata. De Otio. De Tranquillitate Animi. De Brevitate Vitae. De Consolatione ad Polybium. De Consolatione ad Helviam
 L310) Volume III. Moral Essays: De Beneficiis
 L450) Volume VII. Natural Questions, Books 1–3
 L457) Volume X. Natural Questions, Book 4–7

History

Ammianus Marcellinus
 L300) Roman History: Volume I. Books 14–19
 L315) Roman History: Volume II. Books 20–26
 L331) Roman History: Volume III. Books 27–31. Excerpta Valesiana

Bede
 L246) Historical Works: Volume I. Ecclesiastical History, Books 1–3
 L248) Historical Works: Volume II. Ecclesiastical History, Books 4–5. Lives of the Abbots. Letter to Egbert

Julius Caesar
 L072) Volume I. Gallic War
 L039) Volume II. Civil Wars
 L402) Volume III. Alexandrian, African, and Spanish Wars

Curtius
 L368) History of Alexander: Volume I. Books 1–5
 L369) History of Alexander: Volume II. Books 6–10

Florus
 L231) Epitome of Roman History

Livy
 L114) History of Rome: Volume I. Books 1–2
 L133) History of Rome: Volume II. Books 3–4
 L172) History of Rome: Volume III. Books 5–7
 L191) History of Rome: Volume IV. Books 8–10
 L233) History of Rome: Volume V. Books 21–22
 L355) History of Rome: Volume VI. Books 23–25
 L367) History of Rome: Volume VII. Books 26–27
 L381) History of Rome: Volume VIII. Books 28–30
 L295N) History of Rome: Volume IX. Books 31, 34
 L301N) History of Rome: Volume X. Books 35–37
 L313N) History of Rome: Volume XI. Books 38–39
 L332) History of Rome: Volume XII. Books 40–42
 L396) History of Rome: Volume XIII. Books 43–45
 L404) History of Rome: Volume XIV. Summaries. Fragments. Julius Obsequens. General Index

Sallust
 L116N) Volume I. War with Catiline. War with Jugurtha.
 L522N) Volume II. Fragments of the Histories. Letters to Caesar

Tacitus
 L111) Volume II. Histories 1–3
 L249) Volume III. Histories 4–5. Annals 1–3
 L312) Volume IV. Annals 4–6, 11–12
 L322) Volume V. Annals 13–16

Velleius Paterculus
 L152) Compendium of Roman History. Res Gestae Divi Augusti

The Augustan History, edited by D. Magie
 L139) Scriptores Historiae Augustae: Volume I. Hadrian. Aelius. Antoninus Pius. Marcus Aurelius. L. Verus. Avidius Cassius. Commodus. Pertinax. Didius Julianus. Septimius Severus. Pescennius Niger. Clodius Albinus
 L140) Scriptores Historiae Augustae : Volume II. Caracalla. Geta. Opellius Macrinus. Diadumenianus. Elagabalus. Severus Alexander. The Two Maximini. The Three Gordians. Maximus and Balbinus
 L263) Scriptores Historiae Augustae: Volume III. The Two Valerians. The Two Gallieni. The Thirty Pretenders. The Deified Claudius. The Deified Aurelian. Tacitus. Probus. Firmus, Saturninus, Proculus and Bonosus. Carus, Carinus and Numerian

Oratory

Apuleius
 L534) Apologia. Florida. De Deo Socratis

Cicero
 L240) Volume VI. Pro Quinctio. Pro Roscio Amerino. Pro Roscio Comoedo. The Three Speeches on the Agrarian Law Against Rullus
 L221) Volume VII. The Verrine Orations I: Against Caecilius. Against Verres, Part 1; Part 2, Books 1–2
 L293) Volume VIII. The Verrine Orations II: Against Verres, Part 2, Books 3–5
 L198) Volume IX. Pro Lege Manilia. Pro Caecina. Pro Cluentio. Pro Rabirio Perduellionis Reo
 L324) Volume X. In Catilinam 1–4. Pro Murena. Pro Sulla. Pro Flacco
 L158) Volume XI. Pro Archia. Post Reditum in Senatu. Post Reditum ad Quirites. De Domo Sua. De Haruspicum Responsis. Pro Cn. Plancio
 L309) Volume XII. Pro Sestio. In Vatinium
 L447) Volume XIII. Pro Caelio. De Provinciis Consularibus. Pro Balbo
 L252) Volume XIV. Pro Milone. In Pisonem. Pro Scauro. Pro Fonteio. Pro Rabirio Postumo. Pro Marcello. Pro Ligario. Pro Rege Deiotaro
 L189) Volume XVa. Philippics 1-6
 L507) Volume XVb. Philippics 7-14

Quintilian
 L500) The Lesser Declamations: Volume I
 L501) The Lesser Declamations: Volume II
L547) The Major Declamations: Volume I
L548) The Major Declamations: Volume II
L549) The Major Declamations: Volume III

Seneca the Elder
 L463) Declamations: Volume I. Controversiae, Books 1–6
 L464) Declamations: Volume II. Controversiae, Books 7–10. Suasoriae. Fragments

Biography

Cornelius Nepos
 L467) Collected works

Suetonius
 L031) The Lives of the Caesars: Volume I. Julius. Augustus. Tiberius. Gaius. Caligula
 L038) The Lives of the Caesars: Volume II. Claudius. Nero. Galba, Otho, and Vitellius. Vespasian. Titus, Domitian. Lives of Illustrious Men: Grammarians and Rhetoricians. Poets (Terence. Virgil. Horace. Tibullus. Persius. Lucan). Lives of Pliny the Elder and Passienus Crispus

Tacitus
 L035) Volume I. Agricola. Germania. Dialogue on Oratory

Latin Novel

Apuleius
 L044) Metamorphoses (The Golden Ass): Books 1–11, (1965 printing)

 L044N) Metamorphoses (The Golden Ass): Volume I. Books 1–6
 L453) Metamorphoses (The Golden Ass): Volume II. Books 7–11

Petronius
 L015) Satyricon, with Seneca the Younger's Apocolocyntosis

Letters

Cicero
 L007N) Volume XXII. Letters to Atticus 1–89
 L008N) Volume XXIII. Letters to Atticus 90–165A
 L097N) Volume XXIV. Letters to Atticus 166–281
 L205N) Volume XXV. Letters to Friends 1–113
 L216N) Volume XXVI. Letters to Friends 114–280
 L230N) Volume XXVII. Letters to Friends 281–435
 L462N) Volume XXVIII. Letters to Quintus and Brutus. Letter Fragments. Letter to Octavian. Invectives. Handbook of Electioneering
 L491) Volume XXIX. Letters to Atticus 282–426

Fronto
 L112) Correspondence: Volume I
 L113) Correspondence: Volume II

Jerome
 L262) Select Letters

Pliny the Younger
 L055) Letters and Panegyricus: Volume I. Books 1–7
 L059) Letters and Panegyricus: Volume II. Books 8–10. Panegyricus

Seneca the Younger
 L075) Volume IV. Epistles 1–65
 L076) Volume V. Epistles 66–92
 L077) Volume VI. Epistles 93–124

Church Fathers

Augustine
 L026) Confessions: Volume I. Books 1–8
 L027) Confessions: Volume II. Books 9–13
 L239) Select Letters
 L411) City of God: Volume I. Books 1–3
 L412) City of God: Volume II. Books 4–7
 L413) City of God: Volume III. Books 8–11
 L414) City of God: Volume IV. Books 12–15
 L415) City of God: Volume V. Books 16–18.35
 L416) City of God: Volume VI. Books 18.36–20
 L417) City of God: Volume VII. Books 21–22

Prudentius
 L387) Volume I. Preface. Daily Round. Divinity of Christ. Origin of Sin. Fight for Mansoul. Against Symmachus 1
 L398) Volume II. Against Symmachus 2. Crowns of Martyrdom. Scenes From History. Epilogue

Tertullian and Marcus Minucius Felix
 L250) Apology and De Spectaculis. Octavius

Other Latin Prose

Cato and Varro
 L283) On Agriculture 
 L551) Cato: Testimonia. Origines
 L552) Cato: Orations. Other Fragments

Celsus
 L292) On Medicine: Volume I. Books 1–4
 L304) On Medicine: Volume II. Books 5–6
 L336) On Medicine: Volume III. Books 7–8

Cicero
 L403) Volume I. Rhetorica ad Herennium
 L386) Volume II. On Invention (De Inventione). The Best Kind of Orator (De Optimo Genere Oratorum). Topics (Topica)
 L348) Volume III. On the Orator (De Oratore) Books 1–2
 L349) Volume IV. On the Orator (De Oratore) Book 3. On Fate (De Fato). Stoic Paradoxes (Paradoxa Stoicorum). On the Divisions of Oratory (De Partitione Oratoria)
 L342) Volume V. Brutus. Orator

Columella
 L361) On Agriculture: Volume I. Books 1–4
 L407) On Agriculture: Volume II. Books 5–9
 L408) On Agriculture: Volume III. Books 10–12. On Trees

Frontinus
 L174) Stratagems. De aquaeductu

Gellius
 L195) Attic Nights: Volume I. Books 1–5
 L200) Attic Nights: Volume II. Books 6–13
 L212) Attic Nights: Volume III. Books 14–20

Macrobius
 L510) Saturnalia: Volume I. Books 1-2
 L511) Saturnalia: Volume II. Books 3-5
 L512) Saturnalia: Volume III. Books 6-7

Pliny
 L330) Natural History: Volume I. Books 1–2
 L352) Natural History: Volume II. Books 3–7
 L353) Natural History: Volume III. Books 8–11
 L370) Natural History: Volume IV. Books 12–16
 L371) Natural History: Volume V. Books 17–19
 L392) Natural History: Volume VI. Books 20–23
 L393) Natural History: Volume VII. Books 24–27. Index of Plants
 L418) Natural History: Volume VIII. Books 28–32. Index of Fishes
 L394) Natural History: Volume IX. Books 33–35
 L419) Natural History: Volume X. Books 36–37

Quintilian
 L124N) The Orator's Education: Volume I. Books 1–2
 L125N) The Orator's Education: Volume II. Books 3–5
 L126N) The Orator's Education: Volume III. Books 6–8
 L127N) The Orator's Education: Volume IV. Books 9–10
 L494N) The Orator's Education: Volume V. Books 11–12

Valerius Maximus
 L492) Memorable Doings and Sayings : Volume I. Books 1–5
 L493) Memorable Doings and Sayings: Volume II. Books 6–9

Varro
 L333) On the Latin Language: Volume I. Books 5–7
 L334) On the Latin Language: Volume II. Books 8–10. Fragments

Vitruvius
 L251) On Architecture: Volume I. Books 1–5
 L280) On Architecture: Volume II. Books 6–10

Fragmentary Collections

Old Latin, edited by Warmington, E.H.
 L294) Remains of Old Latin: Volume I. Ennius. Caecilius
 L314) Remains of Old Latin: Volume II. Livius Andronicus. Naevius. Pacuvius. Accius
 L329) Remains of Old Latin: Volume III. Lucilius. The Law of the Twelve Tables
 L359) Remains of Old Latin: Volume IV. Archaic Inscriptions

Fragmentary Republican Latin
 L294N) Volume I. Ennius: Testimonia. Epic Fragments.
 L537) Volume II. Ennius: Dramatic Fragments. Minor Works.
 L540) Volume III. Oratory, Part 1. Beginning with Appius Claudius Caecus (340–273 BCE).
 L541) Volume IV. Oratory, Part 2.
 L542) Volume V. Oratory, Part 3.
 L314N) Volume VI. Livius Andronicus. Naevius. Caecilius.

References

Sources and external links
 The Loeb Classical Library (official page): complete catalogue, information about the series' history and new publications
 The Digital Loeb Classical Library
 The Loeb Classical Library on Wikisource
 James Loeb, The Loeb Classical Library: a word about its purpose and scope (1912)
 
 The ancient texts section of the LacusCurtius website and Greco-Roman collection of the Perseus Project include several of the earliest editions, which have now passed out of copyright. In some cases these editions differ only slightly from those currently published by the LCL; in other cases a great deal has been revised.
 Loebolus: Loeb Classical Library books in the public domain available online
 One Hundred Years of the Loeb Classical Library by G.H.R. Horsley

Dual-language series of texts
Series of books
Editorial collections
Harvard University publications
Classics publications
Translations into English